The reflectance of the surface of a material is its effectiveness in reflecting radiant energy. It is the fraction of incident electromagnetic power that is reflected at the boundary. Reflectance is a component of the response of the electronic structure of the material to the electromagnetic field of light, and is in general a function of the frequency, or wavelength, of the light, its polarization, and the angle of incidence. The dependence of reflectance on the wavelength is called a reflectance spectrum or spectral reflectance curve.

Mathematical definitions

Hemispherical reflectance
The hemispherical reflectance of a surface, denoted , is defined as

Spectral hemispherical reflectance
The spectral hemispherical reflectance in frequency and spectral hemispherical reflectance in wavelength of a surface, denoted  and  respectively, are defined as

where
 is the spectral radiant flux in frequency reflected by that surface;
 is the spectral radiant flux in frequency received by that surface;
 is the spectral radiant flux in wavelength reflected by that surface;
 is the spectral radiant flux in wavelength received by that surface.

Directional reflectance
The directional reflectance of a surface, denoted RΩ, is defined as

where
 is the radiance reflected by that surface;
 is the radiance received by that surface.

This depends on both the reflected direction and the incoming direction. In other words, it has a value for every combination of incoming and outgoing directions. It is related to the bidirectional reflectance distribution function and its upper limit is 1. Another measure of reflectance, depending only on the outgoing direction, is I/F, where I is the radiance reflected in a given direction and F is the incoming radiance averaged over all directions, in other words, the total flux of radiation hitting the surface per unit area, divided by π. This can be greater than 1 for a glossy surface illuminated by a source such as the sun, with the reflectance measured in the direction of maximum radiance (see also Seeliger effect).

Spectral directional reflectance
The spectral directional reflectance in frequency and spectral directional reflectance in wavelength of a surface, denoted  and  respectively, are defined as

where
 is the spectral radiance in frequency reflected by that surface;
 is the spectral radiance received by that surface;
 is the spectral radiance in wavelength reflected by that surface;
 is the spectral radiance in wavelength received by that surface.

Reflectivity

For homogeneous and semi-infinite (see halfspace) materials, reflectivity is the same as reflectance. 
Reflectivity is the square of the magnitude of the Fresnel reflection coefficient,
which is the ratio of the reflected to incident electric field; 
as such the reflection coefficient can be expressed as a complex number as determined by the Fresnel equations for a single layer, whereas the reflectance is always a positive real number.

For layered and finite media, according to the CIE, reflectivity is distinguished from reflectance by the fact that reflectivity is a value that applies to thick reflecting objects. When reflection occurs from thin layers of material, internal reflection effects can cause the reflectance to vary with surface thickness. Reflectivity is the limit value of reflectance as the sample becomes thick; it is the intrinsic reflectance of the surface, hence irrespective of other parameters such as the reflectance of the rear surface. Another way to interpret this is that the reflectance is the fraction of electromagnetic power reflected from a specific sample, while reflectivity is a property of the material itself, which would be measured on a perfect machine if the material filled half of all space.

Surface type
Given that reflectance is a directional property, most surfaces can be divided into those that give specular reflection and those that give diffuse reflection.

For specular surfaces, such as glass or polished metal, reflectance is nearly zero at all angles except at the appropriate reflected angle; that is the same angle with respect to the surface normal in the plane of incidence, but on the opposing side. When the radiation is incident normal to the surface, it is reflected back into the same direction.

For diffuse surfaces, such as matte white paint, reflectance is uniform; radiation is reflected in all angles equally or near-equally. Such surfaces are said to be Lambertian.

Most practical objects exhibit a combination of diffuse and specular reflective properties.

Water reflectance

Reflection occurs when light moves from a medium with one index of refraction into a second medium with a different index of refraction.

Specular reflection from a body of water is calculated by the Fresnel equations.<ref name="Ottav">Ottaviani, M. and Stamnes, K. and Koskulics, J. and Eide, H. and Long, S.R. and Su, W. and Wiscombe, W., 2008: 'Light Reflection from Water Waves: Suitable Setup for a Polarimetric Investigation under Controlled Laboratory Conditions. Journal of Atmospheric and Oceanic Technology, 25 (5), 715--728.</ref> Fresnel reflection is directional and therefore does not contribute significantly to albedo which primarily diffuses reflection.

A real water surface may be wavy. Reflectance, which assumes a flat surface as given by the Fresnel equations, can be adjusted to account for waviness.

Grating efficiency
The generalization of reflectance to a diffraction grating, which disperses light by wavelength, is called diffraction efficiency''.

Other radiometric coefficients

See also
Bidirectional reflectance distribution function
Colorimetry
Emissivity
Lambert's cosine law
Transmittance
Sun path
Light Reflectance Value
Albedo

References

External links

Reflectivity of metals .
Reflectance Data.

Physical quantities
Radiometry
Dimensionless numbers